3Peace Lovers (stylized 3Peace☆Lovers) was a Japanese project group formed by Happinet in 2012. The group consists of 3 members: actor Yoshihide Sasaki, visual-kei band member Hayato Nikaido, and ZE:A member Ha Min-woo. The group was put together as a crossover between J-pop, visual-kei rock, and K-pop, which each member represents respectively.

Members

 Yoshihide Sasaki
 Hayato Nikaido
 Ha Min-woo

Discography

Studio albums

Singles

References

External links

 

Japanese boy bands
Japanese pop music groups
Musical groups established in 2012
2012 establishments in Japan